La Paternal or Paternal is a neighborhood or district in the centre of Buenos Aires city, Argentina. It was founded in 1904 by a city decree (decreto) and was named 'La Paternal' after the train station in the neighbourhood, a former industrial zone.

La Paternal neighbours the following barrios: Agronomía, Chacarita, Villa Crespo, Villa General Mitre, Villa Santa Rita and Caballito.

Primarily a residential quarter, it has mostly condos and single-family homes, and a shopping district on its main venue, Avenida San Martín.

The barrio is traditionally associated with Argentinos Juniors football team, whose social headquarters is at the northern part of the neighbourhood.

External links

  Barriada.com.ar
  El Paternalense
  Nuestro Barrio Web

Neighbourhoods of Buenos Aires